Bisdisulizole disodium (INN/USAN, trade name Neo Heliopan AP, INCI disodium phenyl dibenzimidazole tetrasulfonate) is a water-soluble organic compound which is added to sunscreens to absorb UVA rays. It is marketed by Symrise.

Bisdisulizole disodium is not approved in the United States by the FDA, but it has been approved in the European Union since the year 2000 and other parts of the world.

References

Benzimidazoles
Sunscreening agents
Organic sodium salts
Sulfonates